Amarfis is the vocalist for the band "Amarfis y la Banda de Attake".

Discography
 Amarfis y la Banda de Atakke (1998)

 El Liqueo
 Los Grilleros
 Tiene Caché
 Mientes
 Que Pena Me Da
 Te Estoy Chequeando
 Volverás
 Le Meto Mano
 Si Supieras
 El Borrachón

 Cáeme Atrás! (2000)

 Mis Chelitos
 Los Brakers
 Si Te Pudiera Mentir
 Cáeme Atrás
 Las Mujeres
 Me Muero Por Ella
 Aquí Se Paga To'
 El Gancho
 Donde Andarás (Bachata)
 Mala Fe
 Que Pase la Señorita
 Llegó el Burro

 La Revolución del Mambo (2002)

 El Hoyo
 Te Gustó
 No Me Diga Na'
 El Bacalao
 Ayúdala
 Bounce
 Callao
 Pa' Eso Bebe
 Agárrame Eso Ahí (El Comparón)
 Es Que Te Quiero
 Cuando Te Enamores
 Va a Seguir

 Chillin' (2003)

 Ta' Te Mansa
 El Arenque
 Casado Pero No Capado
 Te Guayaste
 Chillin'
 El Concón
 Spanish Girl
 Detenedla Ya
 Que Pelo
 Acuérdate
 La Tuerca
 Por Pariguayo

 On My Own (2004)

 Tú Va a Ser Pa' Mi
 Yemayá
 Vive Tu Vida
 Lamento Boliviano
 La Pechuga
 Amor Amar
 Papá Bocó
 Gotitas de Escarcha
 Mariana Que Hago
 To' la' Mujeres Rapan
 La Langosta
 El Ñame
 Me Dejó

 15 Éxitos de la Revolución del Mambo (2006)

 Ta' Te Mansa
 El Arenque
 Te Guayaste
 Chillin'
 Spanish Girl
 Acuérdate
 El Hoyo
 El Bacalao
 Bounce
 Pa' Eso Bebe
 Agárrame Eso Ahí (El Comparón)
 Cuando Te Enamores
 Va a Seguir
 Te Gustó
 Es Que Te Quiero

 On Fire (2006)

 En Fuego (On Fire)
 La Arepa
 El Último Beso
 El Billete
 Cara de Gitana
 El Calientico
 El Cocomordán
 Esperándote
 Te Extraño
 Un Gustazo, Un Trancazo
 El Guerrero
 El Brujo

 7ma Sinfonía de Mambo (2009)

 El Pollo
 Maldito Duende
 Primero En Tu Corazón
 Dámelo Todito
 Merengue Con Gagá
 Si Tú Te Vas de Mi
 Madre
 La Masoquista
 Full de To'
 Meto Mano
 Te Solté Por Grillo (feat. Chino Aguakate)
 Navidad Pa' Bebe
 Me Estoy Muriendo (Cumbia Tex-Mex)

"The King of New York"
 En Vivo (2012)

 Yemayá
 Tu Va a Ser Pa' Mi
 Papá Bocó
 Lamento Boliviano
 Despues de Ti
 Gotitas de Escarcha
 Spanish Girl
 El Bacalao
 El Arenque
 La Langosta
 El Ñame
 To' la' Mujeres Rapan
 Por Pariguayo
 El Concón
 Vive Tu Vida
 El Cocomordán
 Me Dejó

 Live (2012)

 Introducción
 Cáeme Atrás
 El Billete
 El Brujo
 El Cocomordán
 Cara de Gitana
 La Arepa
 En Fuego (On Fire)
 El Último Beso
 Papá Bocó
 Un Gustazo, Un Trancazo
 Te Extraño

 Internacional (2014)

 Cucaracha
 Monster Winer (Latin Re-Mix)
 Esos Fariseos
 Por Ahi María Se Va
 El Guayo
 La Pregunta
 Esta Noche (Live Bonus Track)
 Solamente Tú
 Viviré Por Ti
 El Mango
 Fuera Fariseo
 Tú No Vales la Pena
 Dime Dónde y Cuándo
 San Lázaro
 Por Ahí María Se Va (Radio Version)
 Mi Sombrero de Yarey

References

|Billboard Winner 2006 = 
Tropical Airplay Song Of The Year, New Artist:
(Tema Tropical Airplay del Año, Nueva Generación)
"Lamento Boliviano" Amarfis y La Banda De Atakke (Amarfica/J&N)

External links
 - La Banda de Atakke Official Site
 - Pandora Music Radio

Year of birth missing (living people)
Living people
21st-century Dominican Republic male singers
Merengue musicians
20th-century Dominican Republic male singers